The 12801 / 12802 Purushottam Express is a daily train which runs between Puri in Odisha and . It is one of the most highly demanded train between Puri to New Delhi. The train is of Superfast category and passes through states of Odisha, West Bengal, Jharkhand, Bihar, Uttar Pradesh. It was the first train in India to have a Braille-embedded coach for blind passengers.

On 2nd November 2021, 1 AC First Class coach added to Purushottam Express. After which, It became the 1st Delhi-Odisha Superfast Train to have dedicated 1 AC Coach.

Timetable
From Puri to New Delhi- 12801. The train starts from Puri every day

From New Delhi to Puri – 12802. The train starts from New Delhi every day.

Coaches
The train consists of 20 LHB coach which includes :-

 Seven Sleeper class Coaches
 Six AC 3 Tier
 One AC 2 Tier
 One 1st AC Coach
 Two General class Coaches
 One EOG & One Divyang-Jan Coach
 One Pantry Car.

Traction
It is hauled by a Tughlakabad or Ghaziabad-based WAP-7 HOG equipped electric locomotive on its entire journey.

Accident
Purushottam Express collided to stationary Kalindi Express near Firozabad railway station on 20 August 1995 nearly at 3 AM. 358 people died in the Firozabad rail disaster and hence it is considered as second most deadliest rail accident in Indian Railways. Kalindi Express struck a Nilgai and was unable to proceed as its brakes were damaged. As the proceed signal was green for Purushottam Express, it collided with Kalindi Express from behind. Three carriages of the Kalindi express were destroyed; the locomotive and front two carriages of the Purushottam Express were derailed. Most of the 2200 passengers aboard the two trains were asleep at the time of the accident.

See also
 New Delhi railway station
 Puri railway station
 Bhubaneswar Rajdhani Express
 Prayagraj Express
 Nandan Kanan Express

References

External links
 http://indiarailinfo.com/train/1304 India Rail Info
 http://indiarailinfo.com/train/1305 India Rail Info

Transport in Puri
Transport in Delhi
Named passenger trains of India
Express trains in India
Rail transport in Odisha
Rail transport in West Bengal
Rail transport in Jharkhand
Rail transport in Bihar
Rail transport in Uttar Pradesh
Rail transport in Delhi
Railway services introduced in 1980